Bertioga is a Brazilian municipality of the state of São Paulo in the Baixada Santista. It is part of the Metropolitan Region of Baixada Santista.

The population is 64,723 (2020 est.) in an area of 490.15 km2. 
Because it neighbors resort towns, its population fluctuates greatly with the seasons. The more northern parts are dense forests and are virtually unpopulated.  The municipality was created on May 19, 1991. Prior to that it was a part of Santos.

The municipality contains the  Restinga de Bertioga State Park, created in 2010 to protect an area of mangroves, restinga and dense rainforest. Its limits are Mogi das Cruzes, Biritiba-Mirim and Salesópolis in the north, São Sebastião in the east, Atlantic Ocean to the south with Ilha de Santo Amaro (opposite to the city) and Santos in the west.

Bertioga is infamously known for being the site where Josef Mengele, a Nazi doctor at Auschwitz, died by drowning in 1979.

References

External links

Bertioga City Hall  
Portal Nosso São Paulo  
Bertioga Facebook Page 

Populated coastal places in São Paulo (state)
Municipalities in São Paulo (state)
Baixada Santista